Ian Dalziel (born 24 October 1962) is an English former footballer who played as a full back in the Football League for Derby County, Hereford United and Carlisle United. He later played for Gateshead.

He was assistant manager at Morecambe from September 2000 to November 2001.

References

1962 births
Living people
Footballers from South Shields
English footballers
Association football defenders
Derby County F.C. players
Hereford United F.C. players
Carlisle United F.C. players
Gateshead F.C. players
English Football League players
National League (English football) players